The 1990 Brabantse Pijl was the 30th edition of the Brabantse Pijl cycle race and was held on 25 March 1990. The race started in Sint-Genesius-Rode and finished in Alsemberg. The race was won by Frans Maassen.

General classification

References

1990
Brabantse Pijl